Ryan Cochran-Siegle (born March 27, 1992, nicknamed "RCS") is an American World Cup alpine ski racer and a member of the Skiing Cochrans family. Cochran-Siegle specializes in giant slalom and super-G, and also races in downhill and combined. He made his World Cup debut on November 26, 2011; his Olympic debut was in 2018, and he was the silver medalist in the Super-G in 2022.

Career

Cochran-Siegle learned to ski at around the age of two, being taught by his mother Barbara Cochran, gold medalist in the slalom at the 1972 Winter Olympics in Sapporo, Japan. After the 2010 season, he joined the U.S. Development Team, and one year later, he was promoted to the National B Team. He was the Nor-Am Cup super-G champion in 2011 and took a bronze medal in the super-G at the U.S. national championships.
Cochran-Siegle made his World Cup debut in November 2011 at the Lake Louise downhill, but failed to finish. A week later in Colorado, he scored his first World Cup points in a super-G at Beaver Creek, finishing in 29th place.

In 2012, Cochran-Siegle won the Nor-Am downhill and super-G titles and two gold medals at the Junior World Championships, in downhill and combined. However, his progress was interrupted in 2013 when he suffered injuries to his anterior cruciate and medial collateral ligaments during the downhill portion of the combined at the World Championships. He returned to competition in the 2014 season, winning the overall Nor-Am Cup; he was second in the downhill standings and third in the super-G and giant slalom standings.

Cochran-Siegle took the 2015 season off to recover from a lateral meniscus transplant, then returned in the 2016 season, when he made his World Cup giant slalom debut and took his first World Cup point in GS with a 30th place at Kranjska Gora. He finished the season with good results at the national championships at Sun Valley, where he was runner-up in the super-G and giant slalom and fourth in the combined. In 2018, Cochran-Siegle was a member of the  U.S. Olympic team and competed in four events; his best result was eleventh in the giant slalom.

World Cup results

Race podiums
 1 win (1 SG)
 2 podiums  (1 DH, 1 SG); 19 top tens

World Championship results

Olympic results

References

External links
 
 
 Ryan Cochran-Siegle at the U.S. Ski Team
 

1992 births
American male alpine skiers
Living people
Sportspeople from Vermont
Alpine skiers at the 2018 Winter Olympics
Alpine skiers at the 2022 Winter Olympics
Olympic silver medalists for the United States in alpine skiing
Medalists at the 2022 Winter Olympics
People from Burlington, Vermont